Beyond Belief: Fact or Fiction is an American television anthology series created by Lynn Lehmann, presented by Dick Clark Productions, and produced and aired by the Fox network from 1997 to 2002. Starting in 2021, a fifth season was produced for the German market, where new episodes are released each Halloween. Each episode featured stories, all of which appeared to defy logic, and some of which were allegedly based on actual events. The viewer was offered the challenge of determining which are true and which are false. At the end of the show, it was revealed to the viewer whether the tales were true or works of fiction.

The series was hosted by James Brolin in season one and by Jonathan Frakes in seasons two, three and four. The show was narrated by Don LaFontaine for the first three seasons and by Campbell Lane for the fourth and final season.

Format
The stories told in the program all have some connection with the supernatural, ghosts, psychic phenomena, coincidences, destiny, or other such unusual occurrences.

Each episode of the show, as well as all stories within, are introduced with a pun or some other form of witticism pertaining to the particular story and episode, and they all include the underlying moral that not everything we perceive as truth and falsehood is as such, and that it can often be difficult to truly separate fact from fiction, hence the show's title.  Since the Frakes era, the intros are filmed on a set resembling the interior of a Victorian mansion.

Each episode typically features five stories, at least one of which is supposedly true and at least one of which is a complete fabrication. The majority of true stories on the show are based on first-hand research conducted by author Robert Tralins yet mostly perpetuate hearsay or urban legends as facts, while many of the ones that turned out to be false are either completely fictional or modern-dressed re-tellings of untrue urban legends.

From season two onwards Jonathan Frakes would end each story with a pun related to the story, while James Brolin always retold a story instead of showing a clip.

Popularity, cancellation and revivals
Beyond Belief: Fact or Fiction had a sporadic airing schedule on its original networks, sometimes going for weeks or even months between airings. There is a two-year lag between Don LaFontaine and Campbell Lane's stints as narrator for the show, during which time it was believed that it had been cancelled, only for it to be brought back for another season in the summer of 2002. It was cancelled after its 2002 season. During his stint as narrator, Lane played the character John August in the Season 4 segment 'The Cigar Box'.

In Germany, where Beyond Belief: Fact or Fiction is known as X-Factor: Das Unfassbare (The Unfathomable), the show was especially successful and still has a cult following. This led to the X-Factor brand being extended to other shows: The Paranormal Borderline became X-Factor: Die fünfte Dimension (The Fifth Dimension), X-Factor: Wahre Lügen (True Lies) is a German series, and Scariest Places on Earth became X-Factor: Die wahre Dimension der Angst (The Real Dimension of Fear).

Starting on 4 November 2018, to celebrate the 20th anniversary of the series' premiere in Germany, RTL II produced two special episodes under the name X-Factor: Das Unfassbare kehrt zurück (The Unfathomable Returns), hosted by Detlef Bothe. While directly copying much of the original's style and studio setup, this revival was heavily panned by audiences due to the poorer production quality in comparison to the original. The show was continued in 2019 and 2020 on RTL II and now has a total of six episodes, with the latest episodes receiving slightly more favorable reviews.

In October 2021, German private channel RTL II began broadcasting a revival of Beyond Belief: Fact or Fiction, with Jonathan Frakes reprising his role as the host. The first new episode was broadcast in German-speaking countries on October 31, 2021. Unlike previous seasons, the segments were produced and set in Germany, while the introductions by Jonathan Frakes were recorded in Los Angeles. Another set of two episodes aired in Germany on October 30, 2022. The new episodes were filmed in and around Los Angeles and are dubbed for German television. The production was executed by German studios Superama Film and Wiedemann & Berg Television and will feature 10 new stories.

Episodes
Of the 239 stories told over the course of the 48 episodes, 139 were declared to be "fact." Each episode of the series' run had at least one "fiction" story and at least two "fact" stories.

Series overview
Segments in bold were marked "Fact" by the show.

Season 1 (1997)

Season 2 (1998)

Season 3 (2000)
This season premiered in Germany nearly a year before it aired on FOX; albeit, out of order.

Season 4 (2002)
This season premiered in Germany over two months before it aired on FOX. The episodes were filmed in and around Vancouver, British Columbia, unlike with previous seasons, which were filmed in California.

Season 5 (2021–23)
This season was produced exclusively for the German television market by German channel RTL II. The first episode premiered in Germany on Halloween 2021, with further episodes being released each following Halloween. Unlike previous seasons, the segments of the first episode were produced and set in Germany, while the introductions by Jonathan Frakes were recorded in Los Angeles. Multiple German media personalities such as Gronkh made guest appearances. Eight more episodes of season 5 were filmed in and around Los Angeles in 2022, with the first two episodes airing on October 30, 2022 in Germany. As of 2022, the English versions of these episodes have not been released in any market.

Syndication/Home media
During its final run of Fox, the series was picked up for reruns by the Sci-fi Channel, which ran from July 8, 2002 to September 6, 2005. It would later air on the now defunct Chiller channel from 2009 to 2015.

Beyond Belief: Fact or Fiction Season One was released on DVD in Region 1 on August 28, 2007. In 2018, FilmRise obtained the rights to the series, and made it available for video streaming via Amazon Prime and other services, including their YouTube channel.

See also
 Urban Legends
 Mostly True Stories?: Urban Legends Revealed
 Penn & Teller Tell a Lie

References

External links
 

1997 American television series debuts
2002 American television series endings
1990s American mystery television series
2000s American mystery television series
1990s American science fiction television series
2000s American science fiction television series
1990s American anthology television series
Fox Broadcasting Company original programming
English-language television shows
Paranormal television
Television series about urban legends
Television series by Dick Clark Productions
Television shows filmed in Vancouver
2000s American anthology television series